Svartå Manor is a manor house located at the southernmost tip of lake Lill-Björken in Degerfors Municipality, Örebro County. The current standing manor was built in 1782, during the Gustavian era, and consists of three buildings and a manor park.

The manor was built during the residency of Carl Falker, hofmarschall to the Swedish Royal Court.

In 2021, the manor house was acquired by two Swedish writers.

See also 

 List of castles and palaces in Sweden
 Degernäs Manor
 Ölsboda Manor

References 

Buildings and structures in Degerfors Municipality
Manor houses in Sweden